Cima Valmora is a mountain of Lombardy, Italy. It is located within the Bergamo Alps. The mountain has an elevation of 2,198 metres.

Mountains of the Alps
Mountains of Lombardy